Eurymedousa or Eurymedusa is a name attributed to several women in Greek mythology.

Eurymedousa, daughter of Cletor or Achelous. Zeus approached and seduced her in the form of an ant, she may also have been transformed into an ant. As a result, she gave birth to Myrmidon.
Eurymedousa, an old woman from Apeire and the nanny and attendant of Nausicaa.
Eurymedousa, possible mother of the Charites by Zeus.
Eurymedousa, a daughter of Aetolus and possibly the mother of Oeneus by Porthaon.
Eurymedousa, daughter of Polyxenus, one of the would-be sacrificial victims of Minotaur rescued by Theseus.

Notes

References 

 Homer, The Odyssey with an English Translation by A.T. Murray, PH.D. in two volumes. Cambridge, MA., Harvard University Press; London, William Heinemann, Ltd. 1919. . Online version at the Perseus Digital Library. Greek text available from the same website.
 Maurus Servius Honoratus, In Vergilii carmina comentarii. Servii Grammatici qui feruntur in Vergilii carmina commentarii; recensuerunt Georgius Thilo et Hermannus Hagen. Georgius Thilo. Leipzig. B. G. Teubner. 1881. Online version at the Perseus Digital Library.
 Pseudo-Clement, Recognitions from Ante-Nicene Library Volume 8, translated by Smith, Rev. Thomas. T. & T. Clark, Edinburgh. 1867. Online version at theoi.com
 Titus Flavius Clemens, Exhortation against the Pagans translated by Butterworth, G W. Loeb Classical Library Volume 92. Cambridge, MA. Harvard Universrity Press. 1919. Online version at theoi.com

Mortal women of Zeus
Characters in the Odyssey
Children of Achelous
Women in Greek mythology
Thessalian characters in Greek mythology